This is a list of those who have served as Solicitor-General of County Durham

1795–?: Sir Alan Chambre
bef. 1833–1834: David Francis Atcherley (formerly D.F. Jones)
1834–1842: Sir Cresswell Cresswell
1855–1862: John Leycester Adolphus
1862–1872: John Archibald Russell
1872–1878: Joseph Kay
1879–1886: Gainsford Bruce
1886–1887: John Forbes
1887–1901: Edward Tindal Atkinson
1901–1905: John Scott Fox
1905–1915: Herbert Francis Manisty
1915–1921?: Arthur William Bairstow
1921?–1930: Henry Arthur Colefax
1930–1932: Edward Alfred Mitchell-Innes
1932–1939: James Willoughby Jardine
1939–1941: Geoffrey Hugh Benbow Streatfeild
1946–1947?: Christian Bedford Fenwick
1950–1956: Harold Richard Bowman Shepherd
1956–1957: Geoffrey de Paiva Veale
1957–1961: George Stanley Waller
1961–1965: Rudolph Lyons
1965–1971: Peter Stanley Price

References

Solicitors-General